Khoroshiv Raion, until 2015 Volodarsk-Volynskyi Raion, was a raion (district) of Zhytomyr Oblast, northern Ukraine. Its administrative centre was located at Khoroshiv. The raion was abolished on 18 July 2020 as part of the administrative reform of Ukraine, which reduced the number of raions of Zhytomyr Oblast to four. The area of Khoroshiv Raion was merged into Zhytomyr Raion. The last estimate of the raion population was 

On 21 May 2016, Verkhovna Rada adopted decision to rename Volodarsk-Volynskyi Raion to Khoroshiv Raion according to the law prohibiting names of Communist origin. Volodarsk-Volynskyi was previously renamed to Khoroshiv.

References

Former raions of Zhytomyr Oblast
1923 establishments in Ukraine
Ukrainian raions abolished during the 2020 administrative reform